Skagit Valley Hospital is a 137-bed public hospital located in Mt. Vernon, in the US State Washington.  The hospital operates a level 3 trauma center. Founded in 1958, the hospital was organized as a Public District operating in Skagit Valley Public Hospital District #1.  The hospital operates two osteopathic residency programs, in internal medicine and family medicine. The hospital is operated by Skagit Regional Health, which is partnered with the Cascade Valley Hospital in Arlington.

History
Skagit Valley Hospital was founded in 1958.  The operations of the hospital are overseen by a seven-member Board of Commissioners, elected by the district's constituents. In June 2007, the hospital opened a 220,000 square foot expansion, at a cost of $95 million. The expansion included 92 patient rooms, 6 operating rooms, a birthing center, and an emergency department.

On July 1, 2010, Skagit Valley Hospital acquired Skagit Valley Medical Center, a multi-specialty medical group, with facilities in six locations in the Skagit Valley. As of the acquisition the former Medical Center facilities was renamed Skagit Regional Clinics. The combined organization is now known as Skagit Regional Health, which also acquired Cascade Valley Hospital in Arlington in 2016.

In 2011, the hospital began training medical students. In 2012, the hospital opened an internal medicine residency.

Services
The hospital includes 137 beds, and operates a level 3 trauma center through its emergency department and a Cardiac Catheterization Unit. The hospital provides oncology services, including PET scanning.

Graduate medical education
Skagit Valley Hospital operates two residency programs, which train newly graduated physicians.  There is an osteopathic internal medicine residency program, and a family medicine program.  Both programs are accredited by the ACGME and maintain osteopathic recognition from the AOA. Medical students from Pacific Northwest University of Health Sciences rotate at Skagit Valley Hospital.

References

External links
Skagit Valley Hospital home page

Buildings and structures in Skagit County, Washington
Hospitals established in 1958
Hospital buildings completed in 1958
Teaching hospitals in Washington (state)
1958 establishments in Washington (state)